The Short Tails also known as the Short Tail Gang for their distinctive short tailed jacket coats were an 1880s-1890s Irish gang located in the Corlear's Hook section of the Lower East Side on Rivington street in the vicinity of Mangin and Goerck streets of Manhattan, in New York City.  The Eastman Gang were also headquartered around Corlear's Hook and may have had its beginnings as a break away gang of the Short Tail Gang. The Short Tails along with rival gangs the Daybreak Boys, Patsy Conroy Gang, Swamp Angels, and Hook Gang worked the New York City waterfront plundering ships of their cargo on the East River. The Short Tail Gang was photographed in 1887, under a pier by noted photographer Jacob Riis, being one of the few 19th century New York gangs to allow its members to be photographed. In fear of being identified and arrested by the law, usually individual police mug shots were the only criminal pictures known to exist.

In popular culture
In the 2014 film Winter's Tale the Short Tails and the Dead Rabbits gangs are featured prominently as well as in the 1983 Mark Helprin novel of the same name.

References

Harlow, Alvin Fay.  Old Bowery Days: The Chronicles of a Famous Street.  1931.     
Nathan, George Jean and Henry Louis Mencken.  The American Mercury - Volume 12. 1927.  
Raczkowski, Christopher T.  The Unblinking Eye: Vision, Modernity and Detection in American Literature.  Bloomington, IN:  Indiana University, 2004.

External links
Who were the Short Tails? The crazy, violent habits of the real Lower East Side gang
Jacob Riis | International Center of Photography (Complete Photographic Collection of Jacob Riis)

Former gangs in New York City
19th century in New York City